Fintan A. Coogan (born 2 June 1944) is an Irish former Fine Gael politician from Galway. He was a Teachta Dála (TD) for five years, a senator for five years, and was twice Mayor of Galway.

Family and early life
The son of Fintan Coogan Snr, a long-serving TD and councillor, Coogan was educated at St. Joseph's Secondary School in Galway and graduated from University College Galway with a BA degree and a H.Dip.Ed. A lecturer in behavioural sciences at the Galway-Mayo Institute of Technology, he has also served on the boards of Galway Airport and of the Great Southern Hotels Group. He is  married with three daughters and one son.

Political career
Coogan followed his father into politics, becoming a member of Galway County Council and Galway City Council, and when his father died in 1984 he was appointed to succeed him as a member of the Western Health Board.

Coogan unsuccessfully sought election to Dáil Éireann in the February 1982 general election for the Galway West constituency, failing to regain the seat previously held by his father. However he succeeded at the November 1982 general election, giving Fine Gael a rare second seat in Galway West. He was defeated at the 1987 general election by Labour candidate Michael D. Higgins, whom he had ousted in 1982. He stood again at the 1989 and 1992 general elections, but never returned to the Dáil.

In 1997 he was elected to the 21st Seanad on the Administrative Panel, but was defeated at the 2002 election to the 22nd Seanad. Fine Gael had suffered heavy losses at the 2002 general election, and the party chose to prioritise younger politicians who appeared to be strong candidates for the next election to the Dáil.

Coogan was mayor of Galway city from 1988 to 1989, and 1994 to 1995. He remained a city councillor until his defeat at the 2004 local elections. At the 1999 local elections he was not selected as a candidate by his local party, was imposed by the party's national executive, and held his council seat with a majority of just two votes over his Progressive Democrats opponent, fish wholesaler Gary Creaven. The recounts extended over two nights, and when his victory was confirmed Coogan said "On the third day, he rose again", prompting The Irish Times to write an article about him under the headline "City's Lazarus claims resurrection status as he defeats provider of fish".

In a January 2008 comparison of the council elected in 2004 with its predecessor, the local Galway Advertiser newspaper gave Coogan a rating of 5 out of 10, noting that "at times he made good contributions but frequently appeared uninterested".

See also
Families in the Oireachtas

References

1944 births
Living people
Alumni of the University of Galway
Fine Gael TDs
Members of the 24th Dáil
Members of the 21st Seanad
Mayors of Galway
Local councillors in Galway (city)
Politicians from County Galway
Fine Gael senators
Alumni of Galway-Mayo Institute of Technology